The Cessna 152 is an American two-seat, fixed-tricycle-gear, general aviation airplane, used primarily for flight training and personal use. It was based on the earlier Cessna 150 incorporating a number of minor design changes and a slightly more powerful engine with a longer time between overhaul.

The Cessna 152 has been out of production for almost forty years, but many are still airworthy and are in regular use for flight training.

Development

First delivered in 1977 as the 1978 model year, the 152 was a modernization of the proven Cessna 150 design. The 152 was intended to compete with the new Beechcraft Skipper and Piper Tomahawk, both of which were introduced the same year.

As with the 150, the great majority of 152s were built at the Cessna factory in Wichita, Kansas. A number of aircraft were also built by Reims Aviation of France and given the designation F152/FA152.

Production of the 152 was ended in 1985 when Cessna ended production of all of their light aircraft; by that time, a total of 7,584 examples of the 152, including A152 and FA152 Aerobat aerobatic variants, had been built worldwide.

In 2007 Cessna announced that it would build a light-sport successor, designated the Model 162 Skycatcher, although production ended in 2013.

Design

Powerplant
All Cessna 152s were manufactured with a Lycoming O-235 engine which has been in production since 1942. The Lycoming provided not only an increase in engine power over the Cessna 150, but also was more compatible with the newer 100LL low-lead fuel.

Cessna 152s produced between 1977 and 1982 were equipped with Lycoming O-235-L2C engines producing  at 2,550 rpm. This engine still suffered some lead-fouling problems in service. In 1983, it was succeeded by the  O-235-N2C which featured a different piston design and a redesigned combustion chamber to reduce this problem. The N2C engine was used until 152 production ended in 1985.

Airframe
The airframe is mainly of metal construction. being primarily of 2024-T3 aluminum alloy with riveted skin. Components such as wingtips and fairings are made from glass-reinforced plastic. The fuselage is a semi-monocoque with vertical bulkheads and frames joined by longerons running the length of the fuselage. The wings are of a strut-braced design and have a 1 degree dihedral angle. The tapered (outboard) portion of each wing has one degree of washout (the chord of the tip section has one degree lower angle of attack than the chord at the end of the constant-width section). This allows greater aileron effectiveness during a stall.

The 1978 model has a one piece cowling nose bowl that requires removing the propeller to remove it. The 1979 model introduced a split-nose cowling nose bowl that can be removed without removing the propeller.

Flying controls

Dual controls are available as optional equipment on the Cessna 152 and almost all 152s have this option installed.

The Cessna 152 is equipped with differential ailerons that move through 20 degrees upwards and 15 degrees downwards. It has single-slotted fowler flaps which are electrically operated and deploy to a maximum of 30 degrees. The rudder can move 23 degrees to either side and is fitted with a ground-adjustable trim tab. The elevators move up through 25 degrees and down through 18 degrees. An adjustable trim tab is installed on the right elevator and is controlled by a small wheel in the center of the control console. The trim tab moves 10 degrees up and 20 degrees down relative to the elevator chordline.

Landing gear
The Cessna 152 is equipped with fixed tricycle landing gear. The main gear has tubular steel legs surrounded by a full-length fairing with a step for access to the cabin. The main gear has a  wheelbase.

The nosewheel is connected to the engine mount and has an oleo strut to dampen and absorb normal operating loads. The nosewheel is steerable through 30 degrees either side of neutral and can castor under differential braking up to 30 degrees. It is connected to the rudder pedals through a spring linkage.

The braking system consists of single disc brake assemblies fitted to the main gear and operated by a hydraulic system. Brakes are operated by pushing on the top portion of the rudder pedals. It is possible to use differential braking when taxiing and this allows very tight turns to be made.

The 152 is also fitted with a parking brake system. It is applied by depressing both toe brakes and then pulling the "Park Brake" lever to the pilot's left. The toe brakes are then released but pressure is maintained in the system thereby leaving both brakes engaged.

The standard tires used are 600 X 6 on the main gear and 500 X 5 on the nosewheel.

Modifications

There are hundreds of modifications available for the Cessna 152. The most frequently installed include:

Tailwheel landing gear
Taildragger conversions are available and have been fitted to some 152s. It involves strengthening the fuselage for the main gear being moved further forward, removing the nosewheel and strengthening the tail area for the tailwheel. This greatly improves short field performance and is claimed to give up to a  cruise speed increase.

STOL kits
The wings can be modified using a number of STOL modification kits, some improving high speed/cruise performance but most concentrating on STOL performance. Horton's STOL kit is one of the better-known of the latter. It involves fitting a more cambered leading edge cuff to increase the maximum coefficient of lift, fitting fences at the aileron/flap intersection and fitting drooped wingtips. Stalls with these modifications are almost off the airspeed indicator, since instrument error is high at high angles of attack. It has been said that landings can be achieved in two fuselage lengths with the kit installed in addition to a taildragger modification, by balancing power against drag. Takeoff performance is also improved by varying degrees depending on the surface.

Engine
The disadvantage of the Sparrow Hawk conversion is that it uses pistons from the O-235-F series engine and therefore the engine recommended time between overhauls is reduced from 2,400 hours to 2,000 hours.

Other modifications

Other popular modifications include:
 Flap gap seals to reduce drag and increase rate of climb.
 Different wingtips, some of which claim various cruise speed increases and stall speed reductions.
 Auto fuel STCs, which permit the use of automobile fuel instead of the more expensive aviation fuel.
 Auxiliary fuel tanks for greater range.
 Door catches to replace the factory ones that often fail in service.
 Belly fuel drain valves to drain fuel from the lowest point in the fuel system.

Variants

Cessna 152 has only 4 model variants: 152, F152, A152, FA152 (all equipped with the Lycoming O-235):

152Two-seat light touring aircraft, fitted with a fixed tricycle landing gear, powered by a  Lycoming O-235-L2C piston engine, 6628 built. Available with a number of avionic options, aside from the standard Model 152 there was a 152 II with an enhanced package of standard avionics and trim features.  Type approved in 1977 and produced as 1978 to 1985 model years.

A152 AerobatTwo-seat aerobatic-capable aircraft, 315 built. Certified for +6/-3 Gs and had standard four-point harnesses, skylights and jettisonable doors, along with a checkerboard paint scheme and removable seat cushions to allow parachutes to be worn by the crew. Type approved in 1977 and produced as 1978 to 1985 model years. The following aerobatic maneuvers are approved: chandelles, steep turns, barrel rolls, snap rolls, loops, vertical reversements, lazy eights, spins, aileron rolls, Immelmann turns, Cuban eights and stalls (except whip stalls).

F152 Reims-built Model 152, 552 built.

FA152 Aerobat Reims-built Model A152, 89 built.

C152 II Not a special model but with Nav Pac equipment package, which included better quality avionics for IFR flying and additional interior equipment, which makes it a little more basic weight.

C152 T Not a special model but flight school equipment package, with "T" denoting "trainer" and not a sub-model.

C152 Aviat Not a special model but a general overhaul and rebuilt of Cessna 152s by Aviat.

Operators

Civilian operators
The 152 is popular with flight training organizations and is also widely operated by private individuals.

Military operators

Argentine National Gendarmerie operated three from 2004.

Bangladesh Army A152 Aerobat

Bolivian Air Force – 12 in service as of 1987.

Botswana Defence Force Air Wing two A152

Gabonese Air Force one F152

Lesotho Defence Force one A152

Mexican Navy operated seven from 1979

Incidents and accidents
On 9 May 1989, a man who had murdered his ex-wife earlier that evening stole a Cessna 152T at gunpoint from an employee at Beverly Municipal Airport. During the flight, which lasted over three hours, Alfred James Hunter III fired a semi-automatic AK-47 rifle at the ground below, buzzed the South Postal Annex in Boston several times, and briefly touched down at Logan International Airport before taking off again. He was arrested when he finally landed with just five minutes' worth of fuel remaining.
On 24 May 2001, a Cessna 152 violated Israeli airspace and was shot down by an IDAF AH-64 Apache. Estephan Nicolian, a Lebanese student pilot, was shot down after ignoring repeated warnings by Israeli ATC to turn back. This is one of the two only-known operational air-to-air kills using an AGM-114 Hellfire missile.

Specifications (Cessna 152)

See also

References

External links

 Cessna 150 & 152 page on Airliners.net
 "Cessna 152 Aerobat", Smithsonian National Air and Space Museum.
 Cessna 150/152 Model History
 Cessna 150: The Generic Trainer

152
High-wing aircraft
Single-engined tractor aircraft
1970s United States civil trainer aircraft
1970s United States civil utility aircraft
Aircraft first flown in 1976